Saikat Saha Roy (born 12 December 1991) is an Indian football player who currently plays for I-League 2nd Division club Bhawanipore F.C.

Club career

East Bengal
After spending a season being captain for the East Bengal F.C. youth team in the I-League U19 championships Roy signed professional terms with the club.

The 2011–12 season started off well for Roy as he was included in the East Bengal's 2011 Indian Federation Cup squad list. After the Federation Cup Roy made his first start and game for the East Bengal first-team during the 2011 Indian Super Cup against Salgaocar. The match ended with East Bengal winning on penalties 9-8 and Roy scoring the winning penalty. He then played his first professional I-League match on 22 October 2011 against Churchill Brothers S.C. where East Bengal lost 1-0. He then started his second match for East Bengal two months later on 29 December 2011 against Salgaocar. East Bengal lost 4-0.

International
Saikat has represented India U-19 in 2010 AFC U-19 Championship qualification.

Career statistics

Club

References

Indian footballers
1991 births
Living people
Footballers from West Bengal
I-League players
East Bengal Club players
Bhawanipore FC players
India youth international footballers
Association football defenders